Karine Emilie Dahlum (born 16 December 1999) is a Norwegian handball player for Vipers Kristiansand.

She is also a part of Norway's national recruit team in handball.

Achievements
EHF Champions League:
Winner: 2020/2021, 2021/2022
Bronze medalist: 2018/2019
EHF Cup:
Finalist: 2017/2018
Norwegian League:
Winner: 2017/2018, 2018/2019, 2019/2020, 2020/2021, 2021/2022
Silver medalist: 2016/2017
Norwegian Cup:
Winner: 2017, 2018, 2019, 2020, 2021, 2022/23

Personal life
She is the daughter of former international footballer Tore André Dahlum.

References
 

1999 births
Living people
Sportspeople from Kristiansand
Norwegian female handball players